Turbonilla magnifica is a species of sea snail, a marine gastropod mollusk in the family Pyramidellidae, the pyrams and their allies.

Description
The shell has a white or pinkish white color and is often beautifully iridescent. Its length measures 12 mm. The teleoconch contains 11-12 whorls, somewhat flattened, rounded at the impressed suture. They are longitudinally ribbed with curved ribs. The low and rounded columella is not dentate.

Distribution
This species occurs in the following locations:
 Canary Islands
 Cape Verde
 European waters (ERMS scope)
 Mediterranean Sea

Notes
Additional information regarding this species:
 authority: authority with a T. in the initials according to Rolan (instead of G. according to Gofas).

References

External links
 To Biodiversity Heritage Library (8 publications)
 To CLEMAM
 To Encyclopedia of Life

magnifica
Gastropods described in 1879
Molluscs of the Atlantic Ocean
Molluscs of the Mediterranean Sea
Molluscs of the Canary Islands
Gastropods of Cape Verde
Molluscs of Europe